Elections to the Legislative Assembly of the Indian state of Bombay were held on 26 March 1952. 1239 candidates contested for the 268 constituencies in the Assembly. There were 1 three-member, 47 two-member constituencies and 220 single-member constituencies.

Results

List of Political Parties participated in 1952 Bombay Assembly Elections.

|-
!colspan=10|
|- style="background-color:#E9E9E9; text-align:center;"
! class="unsortable" |
! Political party !! Flag !! Seats  Contested !! Won !! Votes !! Vote %
|- style="background: #90EE90;"
| 
| style="text-align:left;" |Indian National Congress
| 
| 313 || 270 || 55,56,334 || 49.95%
|-
| 
| style="text-align:left;" |Peasants and Workers Party of India
|
| 87 || 14 || 7,17,963 || 6.45%
|-
| 
| style="text-align:left;" |Socialist Party
|
| 182 || 9 || 13,30,246 || 11.96%
|-
| 
| style="text-align:left;" |Kamgar Kisan Paksha
|
| 33 || 2 || 2,48,130 || 2.23%
|-
| 
| style="text-align:left;" |Scheduled Castes Federation
|
| 37 || 1 || 3,44,718 || 3.10%
|-
| 
| style="text-align:left;" |Communist Party of India
| 
| 25 || 1 || 1,59,994 || 1.44%
|-
| 
| style="text-align:left;" |Krishikar Lok Party
|
| 16 || 1 || 1,07,408 || 0.97%
|-
| 
|
| 67||0||5,59,492||5.03%
|-
| 
|
|37||0|| 1,24,466|| 1.12%
|-
| 
|
|9||0|| 35,194|| 0.32%
|-
| 
|style="text-align:left;" |Forward Bloc (Marxist Group)
|
|8||0|| 16,847|| 0.15%
|-
| 
|style="text-align:left;" |Akhil Bharatiya Jana Sangh
|
|2||0|| 4,876|| 0.04%
|-
| 
|
| 427 || 19 || 19,17,574 || 17.24%
|- class="unsortable" style="background-color:#E9E9E9"
! colspan = 3| Total
! 1243 !! 317 !! style="text-align:center;" |Turnout (Voters) 1,11,23,242 (2,19,04,595) !!  50.78%
|}

Elected members

State Reorganization
On 1 November 1956, under States Reorganisation Act, 1956, Bombay state was enlarged by the addition of Saurashtra state and Kutch state, the Marathi-speaking districts of Nagpur Division of Madhya Pradesh, and the Marathi speaking Marathwada region of Hyderabad. The state's southernmost Kannada-speaking districts of Dharwar, Bijapur, North Kanara and Belgaum (excluding the Chandgad taluk) were transferred to Mysore state, while Abu Road taluk of the Banaskantha district was transferred to Rajasthan. Hence the constituencies increased from 315 to 396 in 1957 elections.

See also

 Bombay State
 1951–52 elections in India
 1957 Bombay Legislative Assembly election

References

Bombay
State Assembly elections in Maharashtra
1950s in Mumbai
State Assembly elections in Gujarat
Bombay State
March 1952 events in Asia